Oregocerata rhyparograpta is a species of moth of the family Tortricidae. It is found in Pastaza Province, Ecuador.

References

Moths described in 2002
Euliini